Roland Eschelmüller (born 6 October 1943) is an Austrian footballer. He played in two matches for the Austria national football team in 1967.

References

External links
 

1943 births
Living people
Austrian footballers
Austria international footballers
People from Steyr-Land District
Association football midfielders
FC Braunau players
FC Wacker Innsbruck players
WSG Tirol players
Footballers from Upper Austria